The 1925 National Championship (Serbo-Croato-Slovenian: Državno prvenstvo 1925. / Државно првенство 1925.)  was a football competition in the Kingdom of Serbs, Croats and Slovenes. It was the second straight year that the club from Belgrade, Jugoslavija, has taken the championships.

Qualified clubs

Bačka Subotica (Subotica Football Subfederation)
Građanski Zagreb (Zagreb Football Subfederation)
Slavija Osijek (Osijek Football Subfederation)
Hajduk Split (Split Football Subfederation)
Ilirija Ljubljana (Ljubljana Football Subfederation)
SK Jugoslavija Belgrade (Belgrade Football Subfederation)
SAŠK Sarajevo (Sarajevo Football Subfederation)

Tournament

Quarter finals

|}

Semi finals

|}

Finals

|}

Winning squad
Champions:

SK JUGOSLAVIJA (coach: Karel Blaha)
Károly Nemes
Milutin Ivković
Branko Petrović
Mihailo Načević
Alois Machek
Sveta Marković
Đorđe Đorđević
Boško Todorić
Dragan Jovanović
Stevan Luburić
Vladeta Đurić
Dušan Petković
Branislav Sekulić
Petar Joksimović

Top scorers
Final goalscoring position, number of goals, player/players and club.
1 - 4 goals - Dragan Jovanović (Jugoslavija)
2 - 3 goals - Branislav Sekulić (Jugoslavija)
3 - 2 goals - Dušan Petković (Jugoslavija), Rudolf Hitrec, Franjo Giler, Emil Perška, Luka Vidnjević (all Građanski Zagreb)

See also
Yugoslav Cup
Yugoslav League Championship
Football Association of Yugoslavia

References

External links
Yugoslavia Domestic Football Full Tables

1
Yugoslav Football Championship